William Henry Hammett (March 25, 1799 – July 9, 1861) was an American clergyman and politician who served one term as a U.S. Representative from Mississippi from 1843 to 1845.

Biography 
Born in Don Manway, County Cork, Ireland, Hammett studied theology.
Chaplain of the University of Virginia at Charlottesville 1832–1834 and of the State house of delegates.
He moved to Princeton, Mississippi.

Congress 
Hammett was elected as a Democrat to the Twenty-eighth Congress (March 4, 1843 – March 3, 1845).

Death 
He died July 9, 1861, in Washington County, Mississippi.

References

1799 births
1861 deaths
Chaplains of the United States House of Representatives
Year of birth unknown
Democratic Party members of the United States House of Representatives from Mississippi
Irish emigrants to the United States (before 1923)
19th-century American politicians
19th-century American clergy